The Ranfurly Shield, colloquially known as the Log o' Wood, is perhaps the most prestigious trophy in New Zealand's domestic rugby union competition. First played for in 1904, the Ranfurly Shield is based on a challenge system, rather than a league or knockout competition as with most football trophies. The holding union must defend the Shield in challenge matches, and if a challenger defeats them, they become the new holder of the Shield.

Waikato opened the decade with the Ranfurly Shield defending it successfully 21 times prior to losing it.

The Bay of Plenty and Wellington were also involved with short Shield stints during the decade – both beating Auckland at Eden Park, but also both falling to Canterbury. North Harbour secured The Shield for the first time in beating Canterbury, however gave The Shield to a strong Waikato side after three defences.

Fixtures

2000

Waikato finally succumbed to the pressure of Ranfurly shield rugby after valiantly defending the shield 21 times, a run of games stretching back to 1997

2001

2002

2003

After 23 successive shield defences Canterbury fall to long time rivals Auckland – a dominant performance in Christchurch, sees The Shield head to Auckland

2004

A shock upset in Auckland after only two defences, as the Steamers claim their first Ranfurly Shield victory, a historic win at the hallowed turf of Eden Park

After a brilliant home defence over staunch local rivals Waikato – the Steamers fall to Canterbury as the Red and Black take The Shield back down south

2005

2006

Christchurch is the home of upsets as North Harbour win The Shield for the first time in 11 attempts in its 21 year history as a rugby province

2007

North Harbour's historic first run of three shield defences comes to a crunching halt by a simply dominant Waikato displaying electric attacking rugby

Ultimately it wouldn't be a successful shield reign for The Mooloos as Canterbury went on to claim The Shield back after just over a year without it

A dominant Auckland team crushed any hopes Canterbury had of repeating the double figure shield defences of earlier in the decade with a classy win

2008

On the weekend of Rugby's 125th anniversary, a dominant Wellington side broke Gull hearts, and its own 26-year drought stretching back to 1982

2009

In just under two years after losing The Shield to Auckland, Canterbury regain it after a dominant performance in the Capital, outclassing Wellington

Christchurch was again host to a mighty upset as Southland regained the Shield for the fifth time in their history after a 50-year hiatus stretching back to 1959

See also

Rugby union in New Zealand
Hanan Shield
Mitre 10 Cup

External links
Ranfurly Shield history on the Mitre 10 Cup website

Ranfurly Shield
Rugby union trophies and awards
New Zealand rugby union competitions
2000 in New Zealand rugby union
2001 in New Zealand rugby union
2002 in New Zealand rugby union
2003 in New Zealand rugby union
2004 in New Zealand rugby union
2005 in New Zealand rugby union
2006 in New Zealand rugby union
2007 in New Zealand rugby union
2008 in New Zealand rugby union